Wasef Bakhtari (born 1942 in Balkh, Afghanistan) is an Afghan poet, literary figure and intellectual.

Life and education
Bakhtari spent most of his childhood in Mazar-i-Sharif. He attended Bakhtar School for his primary and for most of his secondary education. After his family moved to Kabul, he finished Habibia High School in 1965. He holds a BA degree in Persian literature from Kabul University. He did his graduate studies in the U.S., where he received a master's degree in education from Columbia University in 1976. In 1996 Bakhtari, then a professor of literature at Kabul University, and his wife Noriajan were forced to flee Afghanistan because of the intolerance of the Taliban. They sought refuge in Pakistan. Soon after, Nooria died and he remarried to Soriya Bakhtari, but with a rise in Taliban influence there as well, returned to the United States with the help of World Relief and the United Nations High Commission for Refugees, which resettled them in New Port Richey, Florida. They moved to California after three months.

Work life
For 15 years, Bakhtari worked for the Ministry of Education, writing and translating text books. In 1978, he became the editor-in-chief of Zhwandoon magazine. He has also served as a professor at Kabul University and influenced many other Persian writers and poet in Afghanistan.

Political life
Bakhtari was one of the founders and leaders of the leftist and Maoist party, Shalleh-ye Javiyd. In 1978, when the Khalqi government took power, he was thrown into prison for two years. He left politics after he was freed in 1980.

Poetry and literature
Bakhtari is one of the most noted modern Persian poets and writers in Afghanistan. He is regarded as a literary leader to most Persian writers, poets, and linguists in Afghanistan. He was one of the first Persian poets to introduce she’r-e nimaa'i ("Nimaic poetry") and he is regarded in having his own style of Persian poetry. He was under the influence of Rahi Moayeri, Amiri Firoozkouhi, and Ahmad Shamlou.

References

See also

 Persian literature

Tajik poets
Afghan Tajik people
20th-century Afghan poets
Afghan writers
1942 births
Living people
Afghan expatriates in the United States
Teachers College, Columbia University alumni
Afghan expatriates in Pakistan
21st-century Afghan poets